Halcyon Digest is the fifth studio album by American indie rock band Deerhunter. It was released September 27, 2010 to universal critical acclaim. It was the band's first album distributed solely by 4AD worldwide (previously 4AD only handled overseas distribution while Kranky handled it within the U.S.) The album was produced by the band and Ben H. Allen, and was recorded at Chase Park Transduction studios in Athens, Georgia with engineer David Barbe. The final track, "He Would Have Laughed" was recorded separately by Bradford Cox at Notown Sound in Marietta, Georgia and is a tribute to Jay Reatard.

It is the band's last album to feature bass guitarist Josh Fauver.

Concept 

Writing on his Facebook profile page, Cox stated "The album's title is a reference to a collection of fond memories and even invented ones, like my friendship with Ricky Wilson or the fact that I live in an abandoned victorian autoharp factory. The way that we write and rewrite and edit our memories to be a digest version of what we want to remember, and how that's kind of sad."

Answering the Q magazine question as to whether the album was "...supposed to sound like a newsletter or bulletin board from somewhere mysterious", Bradford Cox said: "It's supposed to be like a collection of short dispatches". He called the use of the word 'Halcyon' misleading, adding: "It has a lot to do with the way people romanticize the past, even if it was horrific."

The album artwork was provided by renowned Atlanta photographer George Mitchell. Deerhunter drummer, Moses Archuleta, initially suggested a "stark black and white theme" with Cox ultimately selecting Mitchell's photograph because "it had an immediate connection to the music, especially songs like 'Basement Scene'."

The picture portrays Dennis Dinion, a contestant in The Miss Star Lite Pageant at the Star Lite Lounge on Ponce de Leon Avenue in Atlanta, Georgia. It was shot by Mitchell on New Year's Eve, December 31, 1982, the last night the Star Lite was open. Dennis Dinion worked as a substitute teacher in the Atlanta Public Schools. Bradford Cox described the artwork during an Instagram live on October 31, 2018, saying that a book fell off the shelf and opened to this page and he felt it was fate. It was a photo book of the Ponce de Leon area in Atlanta. Cox spent time in his childhood near the Star Lite Lounge; he was just a few months old the night of the Miss Star Lite Pageant.

Promotion
To help promote the release of the LP, the group launched a new website where they urged fans to download a promotional flyer (created by Cox by photocopying images together) and email pictures of it "hanging in your town, neighborhood, bedrooms, etc." To reward those who had emailed photos, the band revealed the track listing and album artwork via email. The first single, "Revival," along with some unused demos and b-side "Primitive 3D" were also made available to fans who had posted flyers. "Helicopter" was later released as a single with a video available on September 8.

About the flyer concept, Cox stated he was inspired by the record promotion he witnessed in the 80s. He recalls:

Reception

Halcyon Digest received widespread acclaim. At Metacritic, which assigns a normalized rating out of 100 to reviews from mainstream critics, the album received an average score of 86, based on 33 reviews, indicating "Universal Acclaim". It ranked second in Exclaim!'s Pop & Rock Albums of the Year where Cam Lindsay credits Deerhunter with continuing their "impressive streak as one of the more consistent sonic explorer's [sic] within the indie rock canon."  The album also appeared at #3 on Pitchforks 50 Greatest Albums of 2010, where Rob Mitchum writes that the work's rough-yet-shimmery production and existential theme "demonstrates that the ache of mortality can be even more wounding in the bright glare of daytime than late at night."

The album was also included in the 2010 edition of the book 1001 Albums You Must Hear Before You Die.

The album was ranked the 3rd best album from 2010-2014, and 29th best in the 2010s in lists published by Pitchfork.

Track listing

Personnel
Credits adapted from Allmusic and album liner notes.

Deerhunter
Moses Archuleta – drums
Bradford J. Cox – lead vocals, guitar
Joshua Fauver – bass
Lockett Pundt – guitar, lead vocals (6, 9)

Additional musicians
Bill Oglesby – saxophone (9 and 10)
Paul McPherson – 12 string guitar (10)

Recording personnel
Ben H. Allen – producer, mixing, overdubs, additional production (11)
Deerhunter – producer
David Barbe – engineer, mixing (7)
Drew Vandenberg – assistant engineer
Rocbert Gardner – mixing assistant
Henry Barbe – producer and engineer (7)
Winston Barbe – assistant engineer (7), intern
David Barbe – mixing (7)
Bradford Cox – recording (11)
Joe Lambert – mastering
Yousuf Ahmed – intern
Matt Tuttle – intern
Paul McPherson – assistant to the band

Artwork
George Mitchell – cover photo, photography
Dennis Dinion – model
Bradford Cox – typography, layout, design, additional artwork
Will Govus – inside photo
Deerhunter – photography
Dan Gallo – layout assistance

Chart positions

As of 2011 it has sold 59,879 copies in United States according to Nielsen SoundScan.

References

External links

Deerhunter albums
2010 albums
4AD albums